Dwayne Howell Wayans (born July 20, 1956) is an American writer and film score composer. He is a member of the Wayans family.

Early life
Wayans was born in New York City, the son of Elvira Alethia (Green), a homemaker and social worker, and Howell Stouten Wayans, a supermarket manager. His family were Jehovah's Witnesses. He and his family lived in New York's Chelsea neighborhood. He is the brother of Keenen, Kim, Elvira (who was named after her mother), Nadia, Damon Sr., Shawn, and Marlon.

Career
He worked as production assistant and performed as background characters and in sketches on the shows of brothers Keenen Ivory Wayans (In Living Color) and Damon Wayans, Sr. (My Wife and Kids).

Dwayne has also composed original music for My Wife and Kids (2003–05), Thugaboo: Sneaker Madness (2006), and television series the Underground (2016).

Filmography
Major Payne (1995) 
Underground (2006)
Thugaboo: A Miracle on D-Roc's Street (2006)
Thugaboo: Sneaker Madness (2006)
Little Man (2006)
Domino (2005)
Dance Flick (2009)

See also
Wayans family

References

External links

1956 births
African-American male actors
African-American writers
American writers
American film score composers
American male film score composers
Living people
Male actors from New York City
Dwayne
Writers from Manhattan
21st-century American male actors
American male film actors
American people of Malagasy descent
People from Chelsea, Manhattan
21st-century African-American people
20th-century African-American people